FC Zenit Izhevsk is a Russian football club from Izhevsk, founded in 2011. It played its first professional season in the Russian Second Division in 2011, where it replaced FC SOYUZ-Gazprom Izhevsk.

Current squad 
As of 22 February 2023, according to the official Second League website.

References

External links 

 Official website

 
Association football clubs established in 2011
Football clubs in Izhevsk
2011 establishments in Russia